Ackerly is a city in Dawson and Martin Counties in the U.S. state of Texas. As of the 2010 Census, the population was 220. The Martin county portion of Ackerly is part of the Midland-Odessa metropolitan area.

History

The town was established in 1923 and named for the town founder Paul Ackerly. In 1995, a local discovered the Ackerly meteorite while plowing his cotton field.

Geography

Ackerly is located at  (32.525563, –101.714242).

According to the United States Census Bureau, the city has a total area of 0.3 square miles (0.8 km2), all land.

Demographics

2020 census

As of the 2020 United States census, there were 264 people, 94 households, and 75 families residing in the city.

2000 census
As of the census of 2000, 245 people, 80 households, and 60 families resided in the city. The population density was 792.5 people per square mile (305.1/km2). There were 96 housing units at an average density of 310.5 per square mile (119.6/km2). The racial makeup of the city was 69.80% White, 28.98% from other races, and 1.22% from two or more races. Hispanics or Latinos of any race were 48.98% of the population.

Of 80 households, 45.0% had children under the age of 18 living with them, 70.0% were married couples living together, 3.8% had a female householder with no husband present, and 25.0% were not families. About 20.0% of all households were made up of individuals, and 7.5% had someone living alone who was 65 years of age or older. The average household size was 3.06 and the average family size was 3.65.

In the city, the population was distributed as 33.9% under the age of 18, 7.3% from 18 to 24, 23.3% from 25 to 44, 26.9% from 45 to 64, and 8.6% who were 65 years of age or older. The median age was 34 years. For every 100 females, there were 104.2 males. For every 100 females age 18 and over, there were 86.2 males.

The median income for a household in the city was $27,222, and for a family was $31,250. Males had a median income of $36,667 versus $15,000 for females. The per capita income for the city was $12,081. About 20.0% of families and 20.2% of the population were below the poverty line, including 25.7% of those under the age of 18 and 13.0% of those 65 or over.

Education
The City of Ackerly is served by the Sands Consolidated Independent School District.

Climate
The Köppen climate classification subtype for the Ackerly climate is BSk; it occurs primarily on the periphery of the true deserts in low-latitude semiarid steppe regions.

References

External links

Cities in Dawson County, Texas
Cities in Martin County, Texas
Cities in Texas
Cities in Midland–Odessa
1923 establishments in Texas